Năeni is a commune in Buzău County, Muntenia, Romania. It is composed of five villages: Fântânele, Fințești, Năeni, Proșca and Vârf.

References

Communes in Buzău County
Localities in Muntenia